Union Transfer is a music venue in Philadelphia, Pennsylvania. Located at 1026 Spring Garden Street in the Callowhill neighborhood, it opened on September 21, 2011, as a joint venture between The Bowery Presents, a New York City production company now owned by AEG Live; and R5 Productions, an independent Philadelphia production company.

Its 1889 building retains signage for its original tenant, the Spring Garden Farmer's Market. From 1918 to 1942, the building housed the Union Transfer Baggage Express Co., storing bags and other items for the railway company; later, it housed a tire shop, a trust company, and a Spaghetti Warehouse restaurant.

Union Transfer primarily hosts indie rock acts, but also folk, electronic dance music, hip hop and punk. Acts that have played there include Mischief Brew, M83, Diplo, Frank Ocean, The Murder City Devils, Cold War Kids, Jim James, Dinosaur Jr, The Tallest Man on Earth, Best Coast, and Cock Sparrer. Union Transfer carries beer from Yards Brewing Company and other local products.

The coat check is named for Japanese Breakfast's Michelle Zauner, who worked there in the 2010s.

References

External links

Music venues in Philadelphia
Commercial buildings completed in 1889
Culture of Philadelphia
2011 establishments in Pennsylvania
Callowhill, Philadelphia